Sulfentrazone is the ISO common name for an organic compound used as a broad-spectrum herbicide. It acts by inhibiting the enzyme protoporphyrinogen oxidase. It was first marketed in the US in 1997 by FMC Corporation with the brand name Authority.

History 
In 1985, scientists at FMC Corporation filed patents on a new class of herbicides containing a triazolinone ring. Sulfentrazone was subsequently developed for market under the code number F6285, with first sales in 1991 and achieving registration in the US in 1997, branded Authority. Other compounds now in the triazolinone class include amicarbazone and carfentrazone.

Mechanism of action 
The effects visible on whole plants are chlorosis and desiccation caused by the inhibition of the enzyme protoporphyrinogen oxidase, which leads to an accumulation of protoporphyrin IX in the plant cells. This is a potent photosensitizer which activates oxygen, leading to lipid peroxidation. Both light and oxygen are required for this process to kill the plant.

Usage 
In the United States, the Environmental Protection Agency (EPA) is responsible for regulating pesticides under the Federal Insecticide, Fungicide, and Rodenticide Act (FIFRA), the Food Quality Protection Act (FQPA) and the Pesticide Registration Improvement Act (PRIA). A pesticide can only be used legally according to the directions on the label that is included at the time of the sale of the pesticide. The purpose of the label is "to provide clear directions for effective product performance while minimizing risks to human health and the environment". A label is a legally binding document that mandates how the pesticide can and must be used and failure to follow the label as written when using the pesticide is a federal offence.

The label includes use for removal of sedges and newly emerged broadleaf weeds including purple and yellow nutsedge, Kyllinga, plantain, clover, spurge, woodsorrel, knotweed, chickweed, curly dock, wild onion, and wild garlic. It is also effective on many grasses including Poa annua, Poa trivialis, creeping bentgrass, fine & tall fescue, perennial ryegrass, Kentucky & rough bluegrass, bahiagrass, Bermuda grass, buffalograss, carpetgrass, centipedegrass, kikuyugrass, seashore paspalum, St. Augustine grass, and zoysiagrass.

Sulfentrazone can be used both pre- and post-emergence and is rapidly metabolised by soybean at the methyl group of the triazolinone ring, which confers a level of safety to that crop.

The compound is not registered for use in the European Union, although another triazolinone, carfentrazone-ethyl, is available there. Sulfentrazone also has uses outside agriculture: it controls vegetation on roadside verges and railroads. The active ingredient has been sold alone or in combination with other herbicides under a large number of brand names including Dismiss, Solitaire and Spartan. Suppliers and brand names in the United States are listed in the National Pesticide Information Retrieval System.

Human safety 
The LD50 of sulfentrazone is more than 2800 mg/kg (rats, oral), which means that it is of low toxicity by oral ingestion. The US Code of Federal Regulations records the maximum residue tolerances in various food products.

References

External links
 

PPO herbicides
Organofluorides
Sulfonamides
Chloroarenes